Moradabad   division is an administrative geographical unit of Uttar Pradesh state of India. Moradabad is the administrative headquarters of the division. It forms a part of the Rohilkhand region. Currently (2005), the division consists of districts of Moradabad, Bijnor, Rampur, Amroha and Sambhal.

 
Divisions of Uttar Pradesh
Rohilkhand